Martain is a surname. Notable people with the surname include:

Alina Martain (late 11th century–1125), French nun and saint
Giolla Ernain Ó Martain (died 1218), Irish poet

See also
Martian